Scutellinia setosa is a species of apothecial fungus belonging to the family Pyronemataceae. Its fruit bodies are disc-shaped with thick black "hairs" (setae) around the cup rim. The smooth, ellipsoid, spores measure 11–13 by 20–22 µm and contain numerous oil droplets. The asci (spore-bearing cells) are roughly cylindrical, measuring 300–325 µm by 12–15 µm. Originally described from Europe, it is also found in North America and Central America, where it grows on the rotting wood of deciduous trees.

References

External links

Pyronemataceae
Fungi described in 1816
Fungi of Europe
Fungi of Central America
Fungi of North America